The Asian Institute of Maritime Studies (AIMS) is a merchant marine college in Pasay, Philippines that provides highly technical learning in terms of maritime education. It is one of the top performing maritime schools in the Philippines. It was founded in 1993 by Captain Wilijado P. Abuid along with his friends.

History
Sometime in July 1993, a group of thirteen educators and merchant marine officers established an institute of higher learning, the Asian Institute of Maritime Studies (AIMS). The forerunners behind AIMS, namely: Capt. Wilijado P. Abuid, a former Navy Officer and a maritime educator in the field of training and upgrading; Atty. Santiago N. Pastor, a corporate lawyer, banker and educator; Dr. Felicito P. Dalaguete, a marine officer and an academician with expertise in marine education and training; Mrs. Jayne O. Abuid, a business woman; Arlene Abuid-Paderanga, Ed.D., a management specialist with background in Architecture and Design, along with other incorporators. Thus, on 16 August 1993, AIMS was legally registered as a non-stock educational institution, and was issued government accreditation by the Commission on Higher Education (Philippines) (CHED) to offer Customs Administration and Merchant Marine courses. AIMS is located at Roxas Boulevard fronting Manila Bay. The campus, with its training facilities housed at AIMS Tower was opened. In 1999, another site at A. S. Arnaiz Ave. corner F. B. Harrison St. was inaugurated to greet the new millennium towards more intensive and comprehensive education and training. In 2005, a new site (a six-storey building) was opened at Roxas Boulevard to house the Maritime College. The shack is also expected to house the Maritime Knowledge X-Change where libraries and an envisioned museum will be opened to the public.

Campus

The maritime institution lies in the vicinity of Roxas Boulevard, A. Arnaiz Street (also known as Libertad Street), Roberts Street, and F.B. Harrison Street in Pasay.

It is composed of eight buildings, namely the AIMS TOWER, AIMS Lighthouse Bldg (formerly MC Building), the AIMS Multi-purpose Court, Maritime College Annex Building, June Five Dormitory, M/V Buffalo Laboratory, Capt. Wilijado P. Abuid Foundation Building (WPA FDTN Building), and the College of Business Building (CB Building).

The AIMS TOWER and AIMS Lighthouse Bldg is located along Roxas Boulevard. It is highlighted with a lighthouse tower, which only serves as the main stairway of the six-storey building. It houses the College of Maritime Education, the Information and Communication Technology (ICT) Office, Maritime College Internet Laboratory, the Maritime College Library, The Ship, state of the art Bridge Simulator and Engine Simulator rooms, Department of Marine Engineering Office, Department of Marine Transportation Office, Department of Naval Architecture Office, the Plotting Room (for Marine Transportation Cadets, the Electrotechnology Laboratory (for Marine Engineering Cadets), Office of the President, Office of the Senior Vice-president, Quality Assurance Department (QuAD) and the Museo maritimo.

The AIMS Multi-purpose Court, or popularly known as MPC, is also located inside MC Building campus. It houses the school grounds and the basketball court which is intended for sports and recreational activities. It also serves as play, demonstration, and drill grounds of both students and employees of AIMS. It also houses the Registrar's Office, Office of the Vice-President for Finance, Finance, Security and Safety Department (SSD), Facilities and Assets Management Office (FAMO), Regiment Office, Corps of Regiment Officers and the Maritime College Clinic.

June Five Dormitory is a five-storey building that serves as home to cadets undergoing the Merchant Marine Cadetship Program (MMCP). The building also houses the Cafeteria and the Bookstore both located at the ground floor.

The Maritime College Annex Building is located on A. Arnaiz Street side but it is connected on MC Building and MPC. It also houses the College of Maritime Education, Office of the Vice-President for Academic Affairs / Academic Director's Office, Physics and Chemistry Laboratory, Admissions & Marketing Office, PSTC, and the AIMS Cooperative and Barber Shop.

Capt. Wilijado P. Abuid Foundation Building is connected to the Maritime College Annex Building, which houses the dormitory for non-MMCP cadets and the WPA Foundation, a foundation that offers Pre-elementary course, Caregiver Training & NCII Assessment course, and Household Services Training & NCII Assessment course. The M/V Buffalo Laboratory is also connected to the Annex. It is used for practicums on both engineering and deck subjects. It is named after the ship M/V Buffalo.

The WPA Extension houses the Center for Languages and Social Sciences (MC-CLASS), Shipboard Training Office (STO), and the Guidance and Counseling Office (GCO).
 
A separate campus which is located at A. Arnaiz Ave. corner F. B. Harrison St. houses the College of Business Building. It is the house of College of Business Education and Training, College of Business Internet Laboratory, Cisco Laboratory, the College of Business Library, Hotel and Restaurant Management Function Room, the College of Business Clinic, NSTP-CWTS Office, Center for Student Services (CeSS), Office of the Vice-President for Student Services (VPSS), Graduate School (GS), Center for Research and Extension Services (CRES), Office of the Vice-President for Administration (VPAd), Human Resource Management Office (HRMO).

On its 18th Foundation Anniversary last February 20, 2012, the AIMS Management, together with Dr. Arlene Abuid-Paderanga, president; and Dr. Felicito P. Dalaguete, AIMS senior vice president, conducted a ceremony for showing to the public the proposed 12-storey building which will become the institute's main building at the future which will be planned to start the construction on the same year.

Academics

The Curriculum
The institute is a semi-military, regimental institution. It implements semi-military discipline to the students in the vicinity of the campus. As a requirement for graduation, a cadet/student should undergo Merchant Marine Cadetship Program (MMCP), a 1-month semi-military academy-style training of AIMS.

Every maritime cadet in the institute are required to finish three years of academics and one year Shipboard Apprenticeship Training on board. They are also required to take the National Service Training Program (NSTP) 1 and 2 as ordered by Republic Act 9163 or the NSTP Act. The only available program in the institute is the Civic Welfare Training Service (CWTS). The Business students of the institute are also in a Four-year Degree program and also required to finish the NSTP-CWTS program.

Courses Offered
SCHOOL OF MARITIME AFFAIRS (SMA) 
Bachelor of Science in Marine Transportation
Bachelor of Science in Marine Engineering
Bachelor of Science in Naval Architecture and Marine Engineering
SCHOOL OF BUSINESS MANAGEMENT (SBM) 
Bachelor of Science in Customs Administration
Bachelor of Science in Business Administration
Bachelor of Science in Computer Science
Bachelor of Science in Hotel and Restaurant Management
SCHOOL OF GRADUATE STUDIES (SGS) 
PhD in Maritime Administration
Master in Maritime Administration
Maritime Education, Training and Certification
Shipping - Ship and Port Administration
Logistics and Supply Chain Management
Maritime Risk, Safety and Security Administration
Maritime Technology - Environmental and Coastal Management
Master in Customs Administration
Diploma / Certificate Programs

References

External links

Asian Institute of Maritime Studies [AIMS] Facebook Page

Universities and colleges in Metro Manila
Education in Pasay